Abū Ḥudhayfa ibn ʿUtba (Arabic: أبو حذيفة بن عتبة; died 633), full name Abū Ḥudhayfa ibn ʿUtba ibn Rabīʿa was an early companion of the Islamic prophet Muhammad. He was the son of Utba ibn Rabi'a, one of the Leaders of Banu Abd Shams. He was the brother of Walid ibn Utba and Hind bint Utba, the wife of Abu Sufyan ibn Harb.

He had a slave named Salim Mawla Abi Hudhayfa, a notable companion of Muhammad and scholar of the quran, whom he freed and announced him as his adopted son but after the revelation of Quranic verses condemning this act, Salim became his close friend.

He died along with his close friend, Salim Mawla Abi Hudhayfa in the battle against Musaylima during the caliphate of Abu Bakr.

See also 
 Salim mawla Abi Hudaifa
 List of expeditions of Muhammad

References

External links 
 https://web.archive.org/web/20041119195654/http://dictionary.al-islam.com/Arb/Dicts/SelDict.asp?TL=1

633 deaths
Year of birth missing
Sahabah who participated in the battle of Badr
Banu Abd Shams